Kurt Sjolund (born 7 January 1955) is a Canadian skier. He competed in the Nordic combined event at the 1976 Winter Olympics.

References

External links
 

1955 births
Living people
Canadian male Nordic combined skiers
Olympic Nordic combined skiers of Canada
Nordic combined skiers at the 1976 Winter Olympics
Skiers from Ottawa